The Night Before Christmas is an alternative title of the 1823 poem A Visit from St. Nicholas by Clement Clarke Moore.

The Night Before Christmas may also refer to:

Literature
 "Christmas Eve" (Russian title literally translates as The Night Before Christmas), an 1832 short story by Nikolai Gogol
The Night Before Christmas, a 1995 play by Anthony Neilson

Film

Based on Moore's poem
 The Night Before Christmas (1905 film), an American silent short film directed by Edwin S. Porter
 The Night Before Christmas (1933 film), an American animated film in Walt Disney's Silly Symphonies series
 The Night Before Christmas (1941 film), an American Tom and Jerry cartoon directed by William Hanna and Joseph Barbera
 The Night Before Christmas, an animated feature film of 1994

Based on Gogol's story
 The Night Before Christmas (1913 film), a Russian silent film directed by Ladislas Starevich
 The Night Before Christmas (1951 film), a Russian animated film directed by the Brumberg sisters
 The Night Before Christmas (1961 film), a Russian  film directed by Aleksandr Rou

Music
 The Night Before Christmas (album), a 2004 album by David Hasselhoff
 The Night Before Christmas (Dai), a 2006 orchestral work based on Moore's poem, by Aaron Dai
 "The Night Before Christmas Song", a 1952 composition by Johnny Marks

See also
 A Night Before Christmas, a 2008 album by Spyro Gyra
 Christmas Eve (disambiguation)
 The Nightmare Before Christmas (disambiguation)
 Twas the Night Before Christmas (disambiguation)